María Guardiola Martín (born 5 December 1978) is a Spanish People's Party (PP) politician. She was elected the leader of the People's Party of Extremadura in 2022, to run as its lead candidate in the 2023 Extremaduran regional election.

Biography
Born in Cáceres, Extremadura, Guardiola graduated in Business Administration and Management, and Business Sciences, both from the University of Extremadura. She then worked for over two decades as a civil servant within the Government of Extremadura.

In 2022, Guardiola was the only candidate who received the necessary signatures to run for the leadership of the People's Party of Extremadura, replacing José Antonio Monago who had held the role since 2008. Her only previous experience in elected office was in her hometown's city council, where the PP was in opposition, and she became the first woman to lead one of the region's two major parties. She was chosen by national party leader Pablo Casado as part of a trend of the party selecting municipal politicians for regional candidacies, and the party endorsement was carried over by Casado's successor Alberto Núñez Feijóo. Fernando Pizarro, the three-term mayor of Plasencia – the fourth largest city in the region – ran a grassroots campaign but withdrew with a week remaining to focus on re-election, leaving Guardiola as the only candidate.

Guardiola has been likened to Isabel Díaz Ayuso, another PP member who was relatively unknown when selected by the party as a regional candidate, and who was elected President of the Community of Madrid. Guardiola dismissed the comparisons.

References

1978 births
Living people
People from Cáceres, Spain
University of Extremadura alumni
People's Party (Spain) politicians